Behgjet Isa Pacolli (born 30 August 1951) is a Kosovar Albanian politician and businessman who served as the first deputy prime minister of Kosovo and minister of foreign affairs from 2017 to 2019 under the Ramush Haradinaj government. Pacolli is a former president of Kosovo, and served as the first deputy prime minister of Kosovo between 2011 and 2014. Pacolli was one of the signatories of the 2008 Kosovo declaration of independence.

He is the major shareholder of Mabetex Group, a Swiss-based construction and civil-engineering company. Pacolli is also the president of the third biggest political party in Kosovo, the New Kosovo Alliance. He is believed to be the world's richest ethnic Albanian. Pacolli has also acted as a mediator in hostage recovery situations.

Early life and education
Pacolli is the son of Isa and Nazmije, the second of ten children. He completed his primary education in Marec and high school in Pristina. He is Kosovo Albanian by ethnicity but has Swiss citizenship as well (which he received in 1992). After receiving his bachelor's degree from the Hamburg Institute of Foreign Trade in 1974, he completed his military service in the Yugoslav army, and soon after joined an Austrian company, for which he worked as a sales representative for ex-Yugoslavia, Bulgaria, Poland and Russia. Two years later, he moved to Switzerland and joined a Swiss company he had gotten to know in Moscow.

Pacolli went to graduate school at the Mösinger Zurich Institute, where he received his master's degree in marketing and management. He speaks various foreign languages, including English, French, German, Italian, Russian, Spanish, and Serbian.

Career 

In 1974, Behgjet Pacolli started his career as a foreign language correspondent and deputy director for development at the Textile Enterprise in Gjilan. He held this position until 1975 when he once again left Kosovo to move to the West to pursue career opportunities.

From 1976 to 1980, Behgjet Pacolli held important management positions in several companies, such as commercial director for regional development of the company Peter Zimmer in Kufstein, Austria, commercial director of Interplastica Project Engineering in Morbio Inf., Switzerland, and afterwards he was named general director at the same company (Interplastica).

In the fall of 1990, he founded Mabetex Project Management, a construction company based in Lugano, Switzerland, which has developed into a large business group now called the Mabetex Group, with interests in construction, banking, insurance, hospital, media, design, etc. From 1992 until 1999, Pacolli's Mabetex worked on several projects in Russia during the Yeltsin era. The firm renovated the White House in Moscow, the State Duma Building, and the Kremlin. Pacolli was later accused of having bribed Yeltsin because he had guaranteed credit cards to the Yeltsin family. In early 1999, Swiss authorities opened an investigation and on 22 January 1999 searched the Mabetex office in Lugano, but the federal prosecutor's office dismissed the case against Pacolli in March 1999, as no incriminating evidence was found.

At the end of the 1990s, during the Kosovo War, Pacolli organised humanitarian aid and donated money to relief. In 1999, he established the Foundation for the Organisation and Reconstruction of Kosovo (FORK) in Lugano. Later, Pacolli began business activities in Kazakhstan, where he worked with Mabetex in constructing new buildings in Astana.

Lobbying for Kosovo independence

Pacolli's commitment to improving the livelihood in his homeland continued after the Kosovo War ended. In 2005 he created the lobbying company "The New Kosovo Alliance", through which he lobbied exclusively for the creation of the country of Kosovo. During this time, Pacolli collaborated with many important figures in world politics, especially American leaders, such as Frank Carlucci, Morton Abramovitz, S. Waterman, Zbigniew Brzezinski, Janusz Bugajski, Henry Kissinger, and many others. For four years, he was also a member of the board of trustees of the Center for International and Strategic Studies (CSIS), in the Committee led by Henry Kissinger, during which time he continued his lobbying efforts towards creating the appropriate conditions for declaring Kosovo an independent country.

The New Kosovo Alliance's lobbying mission, was considered fulfilled by Pacolli and other members of the organization, at the time when US President Bush during his visit to Tirana in June 2007, stated, "Kosovo must be a country, an independent republic, now".

Since Kosovo's declaration of independence in February 2008, Pacolli has been working to convince other countries to officially recognize Kosovo as an independent country. Pacolli has been continuing his lobbying activities all around the world, where he has met senior leaders of world countries in an attempt to convince them to recognize Kosovo's independence.

New Kosovo Alliance 

On 17 March 2006, The New Kosovo Alliance changed its function and transformed into a political party. In the 2007 elections, AKR became the third-strongest party by votes and lead the parliamentary opposition in Kosovo, giving its contribution to the declaration of Kosovo's independence on February 17th, 2008. During this period, although in opposition, Behgjet Pacolli continued to work towards achieving international recognition of Kosovo's independence.

Pacolli became a deputy in the Assembly of Kosovo and a member of the Committee for Budget and Finance. With Pacolli's rise in politics, he was seen as a great asset not only to Kosovo but to its development.

Presidency

On 22 February 2011, Behgjet Pacolli was elected the 3rd president of the Republic of Kosovo.
During the first days in his new role, he visited Mitrovica and crossed into Serb-majority North Kosovo to reaffirm Kosovo's authority and sovereignty on the area. Pacolli went on two out-of-the-country visits as the president of Kosovo, visiting Albania and Macedonia.

He left the role (though without formally resigning) on 4 April 2011, after the Constitutional Court of Kosovo had ruled that his election procedure had been irregular. Nicolas Mansfield, Director of Rule of Law programs for the East-West Management Institute (EWMI) explains that the Constitutional Court held Pacolli's election unconstitutional for two reasons. According to the Constitutional Court, a formal election requires two candidates who run for presidency, and that at least 80 deputies (two-thirds of 120 members) vote in favour of a candidate. Several dissenting members of the Court disagreed with the decision because it would allow a small minority of 41 deputies to prevent constitutional elections, which is inconsistent with the draughters of Kosovo's constitution. Ultimately, Pacolli's case helped improve Kosovo's score for Judicial Framework and Independence in the 2012 Nations in Transit report.

First deputy prime minister 

After his withdrawal from the president's office, Behgjet Pacolli decided to continue the co-governance and took on the role of the first deputy prime minister of the Republic of Kosovo. During this time, with a mandate for recognitions and for foreign investments, he led the lobbying campaign for the recognition and inclusion of Kosovo as a country in the international arena, holding meetings with more than 100 presidents, prime ministers, and kings from many different countries of the world. In February 2015, Albanian President Bujar Nishani awarded Pacolli the Nderi i Kombit (engl. Honor of the Nation) Award for his contribution to the recognition of Kosovo's independence and to the economic relationship between Kosovo and Albania. The award ceremony took place at the Presidential Palace in Tirana.

In late autumn of 2017, Pacolli discussed establishing Serb Municipalities for the Serb minority in Kosovo with foreign policy and security chief Federica Mogherini and EU enlargement commissioner Johannes Hahn. After meeting with Slovenian Foreign Minister Karl Erjavec in December 2017, Pacolli managed to negotiate the establishing of a Committee for Economic Cooperation with Slovenia at ministerial level. Pacolli supports establishing a peaceful economic relationship with Serbia. Serbian media reported that Pacolli is in favour of abolishing tax on goods from Serbia.

Vice prime minister and foreign minister 
From September 2017 to February 2020, Behgjet Pacolli served as vice prime minister and foreign minister of the Republic of Kosovo. On 16 December 2019, Pacolli and his wife met with Pope Francis at the Holy See. Kosovar media reported that Pacolli and Pope Francis would discuss the peaceful coexistence between different communities and religions in Kosovo. Albanian news magazine Sot later wrote that Pacolli and Francis also talked about the Kosovo War. Pope Francis encouraged Masha Pacolli to continue working with women who were traumatized as a result the armed conflict.

Since 2020 

On 26 November 2019, an earthquake struck Albania. As outgoing Kosovo Deputy Prime Minister Behgjet Pacolli and his family personally donated 1 million euros to the relief effort.

On 15 January 2021, Pacolli visited the destroyed village of Thumana with Albania's Prime Minister Edi Rama. Pacolli announced that he would further support relief and build a housing complex that comprises 80 apartments with a square footage of 100 m² each.

Hostage recovery activities 

 
Several times, Pacolli has been directly involved in the release of hostages in Afghanistan and in other countries undergoing conflicts. Assistant professor Dejan Lukić considers Pacolli to be one of the few agents who successfully negotiate the release of hostages with terrorists.

On 28 October 2004, after helping run a presidential election, the three United Nations workers Annette Flannigan, Angelito Nayan and Shqipe Hebibi, were taken hostage in Kabul. The latter of which originated from Kosovo and had neither representation nor support from other countries. Behgjet Pacolli traveled to Afghanistan where he spent a month negotiating on their behalf. Pacolli has been credited with securing their release. On 23 November 2004, the hostages were released. In his 2017 book "The Trade", Jere van Dyk describes that Pacolli paid a ransom to a Taliban tribal leader.

In October 2006, the Italian photo journalist Gabriele Torsello was kidnapped in Afghanistan. Behgjet Pacolli was contacted by an Italian intelligence agency in order to negotiate his liberation. Eventually, Pacolli was successful in negotiating Torsello's release, who was released on 3 November 2006 after 23 days in captivity.

In 2007, Pacolli negotiated the release of 23 South Korean Christian missionaries from Afghanistan. He managed to secure the release of 21 of them, after 2 were executed.

On 19 July 2008, Swiss citizens Max Göldi and Rachid Hamdani were captured in Tripolis, Libya, and held as hostages. In early 2010, Pacolli negotiated with Muammar Ghaddafi and attempted to secure their release.

On 15 August 2011, American-Kosovar Lobbyist James Berisha was arrested by the Eritrean police on a mission to recognise Kosovo's independence. Eritrean Authorities believed that Berisha was an American spy, and he was imprisoned for five months. Berisha was discharged from prison after Behgjet Pacolli travelled to Eritrea and negotiated his discharge.

Philanthropy 
Throughout his career in global business, Behgjet Pacolli also developed philanthropic activities. His Behgjet Pacolli Foundation stimulates the education of youth in elite schools, helps the poor, builds schools, hospitals, supports sports, culture, etc. In 1993, Pacolli established "Les Enfants du Sakha", presently known as "Ibrahim Kodra Foundation" a fund with the stated goal of providing help in the medical care, education and recreation of children. Just in Kosovo, the Behgjet Pacolli Foundation has donated over 20 million euros to various projects.

Pacolli has been the main sponsor of the Aleksandër Moisiu Foundation, and the “Bambimi Di Sakha” Orphanages Foundation. Since 1993, Pacolli has been financially supporting the hospital for the shelter and care of abandoned children born with physical disabilities in Sakha

Starting in 2006, Pacolli began donating for the construction and renovation of several buildings in Kosovo. First, the Parliament Building of Kosovo in Prishtina was renovated with Pacolli's help. Later, Pacolli funded the building of the American University in Kosovo campus. In 2008, he financed the reconstruction and restoration of the Mosque of Llap in Prishtina, a building which is enlisted as part of the cultural heritage of Kosovo. Pacolli financed the expansion and construction of the College of Philosophy within the University of Prishtina the next year. In 2017, Kosovar media reported that Pacolli proposed a twelve-point plan for a large-scale renovation of Prishtina.

Honors and awards

 2002 - 2006: Member of the Center for Strategic and International Studies, and permanent advisor to the committee led by Henry Kissinger
 2002 - 2010: Honorary Diplomat of the State of Liberia
 2009: Peace Ambassador of the Universal Peace Federation
 2010: Cavalier del Millennio per la Pace ("Knight of Peace of the Millennium") of the Centro Nazionale per la pace, Italy
 2010: Honorary Citizen of Lezha
 2011: Gusi Peace Prize, Philippines
 2012: Honorary Citizen of the City of Baton Rouge, Louisiana
 2012: Chancellor's Gold Medal of the Community College in Baton Rouge, Louisiana
 2012: Keys to the City of New Orleans and the State of Louisiana
 2012: Honorary Citizen of Korça
 2014: Special Leadership Award from the POLIS University for his life's work in politics, peace-building and humanitarian work
 2015: “The Acknowledgement of the City of Tirana” honor, given by the mayor of Tirana, Lulzim Basha
 2015: Kazakh President “2015 Constitution of Kazakhstan” Medal 
 2015: Nderi i Kombit, awarded by Bujar Nishani
 2015: Albanian Honor of Nation Order
 2016: Order of the Kazakh President Kurmet for services to the economy, science, culture, education and social affairs
 2018: Doctor Honoris Causa in Economics, awarded by the Ismail Qemali University of Vlorë
 2018: Honorary Citizen of Kukësi
 2019: “Mother Teresa” High Award 
 2019: Acknowledgment from US President Bill Clinton
 2022: Key to the city of Tirana
 Certificate of appreciation from the AUK (American University in Kosovo)
 Nelson Mandela Foundation Award
 Rochester Institute of Technology Honorary Degree
 Doctor honoris causa of European University of Tirana
 Honorary Citizen of Astana, Kazakhstan

Publications

Notes and references

Bibliography

Notes

References

External links

 Personal website
 Biography
 Behgjet Pacolli on the New Kosovo Alliance website
 Behgjet Pacolli at the Assembly of Kosovo
 Behgjet Pacolli on Facebook
 Behgjet Pacolli on Twitter
 Behgjet Pacolli Foundation
 Report of official visits of the first Deputy Prime Minister and Minister of Foreign Affairs Mr. Behgjet Pacolli
 Work report of the Ministry of Foreign Affairs

|-

|-

|-

1951 births
Living people
Kosovan Muslims
Kosovo Albanians
Kosovan diplomats
Presidents of Kosovo
Deputy Prime Ministers of Kosovo
Foreign ministers of Kosovo
Businesspeople in construction
New Kosovo Alliance politicians
Swiss businesspeople
Albanian philanthropists
Politicians from Pristina
Albanian businesspeople